The 1894 Iowa Agricultural Cardinals football team represented Iowa Agricultural College (later renamed Iowa State University) as an independent during the 1894 college football season. The 1894 Cardinals compiled a 5–1 record, shut out three of six opponents, and outscored all opponents by a combined total of 180 to 24. In the first game of the Iowa–Iowa State football rivalry, the Cardinals defeated the Hawkeyes by a 16-8 score. Bert German is identified as both the head coach and the team captain.

Between 1892 and 1913, the football team played on a field that later became the site of the university's Parks Library.

Schedule

References

Iowa Iowa Agricultural
Iowa State Cyclones football seasons
Iowa Agricultural Cardinals football